Dayananda Sagar College of Engineering (commonly referred to as DSCE) is an autonomous engineering college in Bengaluru, Karnataka. It is affiliated to Visvesvaraya Technological University, Belagavi.

Background
DSCE is located in Bangalore, Karnataka.  It is a sector of Dayananda Sagar Institutions. The institute is named after its founder, Shri R Dayananda Sagar, best known for his role in setting up the Mahatma Gandhi Vidhya Peetha Education Trust in 1960, Sagar also played an important role in the education sector of emerging India. It is an autonomous institute affiliated to Visvesvaraya Technological University. DSCE has been securing maximum marks under Visvesvaraya Technological University for five years, continuing the trend of securing 54 university ranks, highest by any college in Karnataka. In 2015, the college was granted autonomy.  It is an ISO 9001:2008 certified institute, approved by AICTE and the University Grants Commission, and accredited by the National Assessment and Accreditation Council. It is ranked as one of the top engineering colleges in Karnataka. It is run by the Mahatma Gandhi Vidya Peetha Trust. The trust manages 28 institutions in the name of Dayananda Sagar Institutions and multi-speciality hospitals in the name of Sagar Hospitals The institute offers a wide choice of engineering branches, with 15 undergraduate and 13 postgraduate courses. Some of the Engineering branches are accredited by the National Board of Accreditation.  The institute has received a National Mission Project from the Department of Scientific and Industrial Research. It has 21 research centres in different branches of engineering which are recognised by Visvesvaraya Technological University..

Academics 
Dayananda Sagar College of Engineering offers 160 undergraduate programs leading to 4/5 year bachelor's degrees, 16 post graduate programs leading to 2/3 year master's degrees and 21 research centers offering a 2/5 year M.Sc.(Eng.)/Ph.D. degrees. The academic degrees are awarded by Visvesvaraya Technological University.

Rankings

The National Institutional Ranking Framework (NIRF) ranked it 126 out of 200 engineering colleges in 2020.

References

External links 

 

All India Council for Technical Education
Affiliates of Visvesvaraya Technological University
Engineering colleges in Bangalore
1970 establishments in Mysore State
Educational institutions established in 1979